Beaver Creek is the official GNIS name in these several Pennsylvania waterways:

Table of Beaver Creeks
 This table is a GNIS search generated list limited to finding the name 'Beaver Creek' in the state of 'Pennsylvania' ONLY. The ID# is the USGS data feature identifier code, and the county column corresponds to the location of the specific feature historically and currently. 
 Place names out of pattern, such as Beaver Branch or Beaver Center will almost always have a historic alternative name form including the 'Beaver Creek' name on the record for the entry ID, so generate a search hit as well.
 The user may then correctly conclude the alternative form is the preferred more-modern use name currently in vogue.

See also
Beaver Creek (disambiguation), non-Pennsylvania uses
Beavercreek (disambiguation)
Beaver Brook (disambiguation)
Beaver River (disambiguation)

References